Gerontius (died 411) was a general of the Western Roman Empire (with the rank of magister militum), who initially supported the usurper Constantine III but later opposed him in favour of another usurper, Maximus of Hispania.

Life

Usurpation of Constantine III 

Gerontius, probably a Briton by birth, was one of the supporters of Constantine III, a Roman general who revolted against the Western Roman Emperor Honorius in 407, conquering Britain, Gaul, Germania and Hispania.

In 408 he followed the son of Constantine, the newly appointed caesar Constans II, to Spain. This province was under Constantine's rule, but here some members of the House of Theodosius, the cousins of Honorius, Didymus and Verenianus, had rebelled. Gerontius, who was the actual commander-in-chief of the troops, fought the rebels in two battles. In the first he was defeated, but in the second he won an important victory in Lusitania, where he had recalled some troops from Gaul, and captured the rebel chiefs.

While Constans returned to Gaul with the prisoners, Gerontius remained in Spain, in command of the local troops.

Usurpation of Maximus 

In late spring 409, Gerontius rebelled against Constantine III, appointing as emperor Maximus, one of his relatives. He moved to Tarraco, but left the city to oppose Constans' invasion. Constantine had just appointed Constans Augustus and sent him to Hispania with loyal troops to suppress Gerontius' rebellion. The reasons for Gerontius' rebellion are unclear. It is possible that Constans' elevation to the throne was a result of Gerontius' rebellion, but it is also possible that the general rebelled just because of Constans' appointment.

To counteract Constantine, Gerontius allied with Vandals, Alans, and Suevi, who had entered Gaul in 407. A Frankish revolt occupied Constantine, who was forced to reduce his pressure on Gerontius, and the Franks and their allies entered Hispania, where they became a problem for Gerontius.

He spent the year 410 defending himself against Constans, and in 411 Gerontius succeeded in besieging the young Augustus in Vienne, capturing him and killing him. He then moved on Arelate, where he besieged Constantine. However, while Constantine was still resisting, Honorius' general Constantius arrived from Italy with an army. Most of Gerontius' soldiers deserted him and went over to Constantius. He was obliged to flee back to Spain with a few loyal supporters.

When the Spanish troops knew of Gerontius' defeat, they decided to get rid of him. According to Sozomen, the Spanish troops blocked Gerontius and his collaborators in a house. Gerontius kept the aggressors away by shooting them with arrows from the roof of the house, but when his arrows ran out, the soldiers set fire to the house. Even if he could have escaped, Gerontius refused to do so choosing to die with his wife. He first killed his wife and his loyal Alan collaborator and then killed himself.

References

Sources 
 Kulikowski, Michael, Late Roman Spain and Its Cities, Johns Hopkins University Press, 2004, p. 157-160.

411 deaths
5th-century Romans
Ancient Roman military personnel who committed suicide
Generals of Constantine III
Magistri militum
Year of birth unknown